Claude Allan Fell (6 December 1892 – 11 May 1972) was an Australian rules footballer who played with Richmond in the Victorian Football League (VFL).

Notes

External links 

1892 births
1972 deaths
Australian rules footballers from Victoria (Australia)
Richmond Football Club players